Calvary Holiness Church could refer to two separate Christian denominations:

For the mid-20th century holiness denomination in England, see Church of the Nazarene.
For the late-20th century holiness denomination with two congregations in Philadelphia, see Calvary Holiness Church (Philadelphia).